The elections for the Chandigarh Municipal Corporation were held on 18 December 2016. The candidates were in fray for the election to 26 seats (wards) of Chandigarh union territory.

BJP won 20 seats and became the single largest party in the council of total 26 elected seats. Congress won 4 seats, SAD won 1 and Independent candidate won 1 seat each.

After the election Ravi Kant Sharma served as Mayor of Chandigarh till 2021. upon succeeding Raj Bala Malik.

2021 Chandigarh Municipal Corporation election were held on 24 December 2021 after the term of the previous elected council had expired.

Background
In the 2011 Chandigarh Municipal Corporation election Congress had won 11 seats out of total 25. Congress was the largest party followed by BJP with 10 seats, SAD with 2 seats, BSP with 1 and 1 independent.

Results

Members 

Ravi Kant Sharma served as Mayor of Chandigarh.

Elected Councillors

Nominated Councillors

Mayor
Mayor is the Head of the Municipal Corporation. Ravi Kant Sharma was serving as the mayor of the city at the time of the next election.

List of Mayors of Chandigarh from 2017 to 2021

Aftermath
The Chandigarh Municipal Corporation council completed its tenure of 5 years. After the council's term had expired, 2021 Chandigarh Municipal Corporation election were held.

References

External links
 Results declared by the State Election Commission

Chandigarh
Elections in Chandigarh
2010s in Chandigarh
2016 elections in India